Echinopsis is an extinct genus of sea urchins in the class Echinoidea.

These slow-moving low-level epifaunal grazers lived from the Cretaceous to the Paleogene periods (125.45 - 5.332 Ma). Fossils of this genus have been found in the sediments of Madagascar, Pakistan, Senegal, Sudan, United States and Switzerland.

References

Glyphocyphidae
Extinct animals of Asia
Cretaceous echinoderms